KAWK (105.1 FM) was a radio station licensed to Custer, South Dakota, United States, the station served the Rapid City area.  The station was owned by Mt. Rushmore Broadcasting, Inc.

As of April 2012, the station was silent, but retained an active license under Special Temporary Authority by the FCC. The station, along with others owned by Mt. Rushmore Broadcasting, filed for an extension of the special temporary authority in early 2015, due to staffing issues. It was reported that staff had unexpectedly resigned, and there was difficulty finding new employees.

In a letter dated May 12, 2017 the Federal Communications Commission ruled that the license of KAWK expired "on or about" October 22, 2009 under Section 312(g) of the Communications Act of 1934. The station's license was cancelled, the call letters were deleted and all authority to operate was terminated.

KAWK filed a Petition for Reconsideration on June 12, 2017.

In another letter dated February 23, 2018, the petition for reconsideration was denied, effectively cancelling the station's license. The reasons stated in the letter indicate the station had been off air for more than 12 months during the licensed term. The FCC noted that when the station resumed broadcasting on August 16, 2009, the station was incorrectly using a previous transmitting location (special temporary authority), not the station's licensed site. The FCC also noted that the station's own actions, finances and business judgements were the reason for its cancellation.

History
The station was assigned the calls KACP on May 28, 1993. On September 16, 1996, the station changed its call sign to KAWK. The station signed on in November 1996 and was licensed on December 18, 1997.

References

External links

AWK
Radio stations established in 1997
1997 establishments in South Dakota
Radio stations disestablished in 2017
2017 disestablishments in South Dakota
Defunct radio stations in the United States
AWK